Kalione Nasoko   (born 2 December 1990) is the current captain of the Fiji national rugby sevens team to the 2018 Oceania Sevens Championship and the 2018 Dubai Sevens. Nasoko was awarded player of the final at the 2017 Hong Kong Sevens Tournament where Fiji beat the South Africa Sevens Team 22-0.  Nasoko made his debut for Fiji at the 2016 Dubai Sevens.

Early life 
Nasoko grew up on the Island of Yawa Levu, an island formed on a volcanic ridge at the southern tip of the Yasawa group of Islands in Fiji. Nasoko's early education was at Ratu Naivalu Memorial School, the only school on Waya Island, a two-hour trek along mountainous terrain.

Awards and honours 
 A Part of 2017-18 Hamilton 7s Winning Team (Gold Medalist) 
 A Part of 2017-18 Vancouver 7s Winning Team (Gold Medalist)
 A Part of 2017-18 Singapore 7s Winning Team (Gold Medalist)
 A Part of 2017-18 Hong Kong 7s Winning Team (Gold Medalist)
 A Part of 2017-18 London 7s Winning Team (Gold Medalist)
 Player of the Final 2017 Hong Kong Sevens
 2016-17 HSBC World Series Dream Team
 2017-18 HSBC World Series Dream Team
 2017-18 Commonwealth Silver Medalist
 2018 Medal of the Order of Fiji

References

External links

 

1990 births
Living people
People from Yasawa
Commonwealth Games medallists in rugby sevens
Commonwealth Games silver medallists for Fiji
Rugby sevens players at the 2018 Commonwealth Games
Rugby sevens players at the 2020 Summer Olympics
Medalists at the 2020 Summer Olympics
Olympic gold medalists for Fiji
Olympic medalists in rugby sevens
Olympic rugby sevens players of Fiji
Fijian Drua players
Fijian rugby union players
Rugby union centres
Medallists at the 2018 Commonwealth Games